Yader Cardoza (born February 22, 1989) is a Nicaraguan professional boxer who challenged for the WBC light flyweight title in 2013.

Professional career

Cardoza vs. Hernández 

Cardoza won the vacant WBC Latino light flyweight title on November 24, 2012 with a unanimous decision (UD) win over Jose Aguilar. After retaining the title by defeating Eliecer Quezada, Cardoza challenged WBC world champion Adrián Hernández on May 11, 2013. Despite a determined display from Cardoza where he managed to swell Hernández's eye, Hernández defeated Cardoza by UD, retaining his title.

Professional boxing record

References

External links
 

1989 births
Living people
Light-flyweight boxers
Super-flyweight boxers
Nicaraguan male boxers